Mount Cobb is a mountain on Vancouver Island, British Columbia, Canada, located  east of Gold River and  southwest of Mount Filberg.

Mount Cobb is a member of the Vancouver Island Ranges which in turn form part of the Insular Mountains.

See also
List of mountains of Canada

References

Vancouver Island Ranges
Two-thousanders of British Columbia
Nootka Land District